Proto:87 is a model railroad special interest group founded in 1978, dedicated to providing a finescale alternative to traditional HO gauge.

Due to manufacturing restrictions and considerations such as durability, ease of operation and price, most model railroad products feature significant compromises that inhibit their viability as accurate scale models of their prototypes. The most visible of these are wheels and track, which can be significantly thicker than the prototype. The desirability of realistic wheel dimensions among some modelers helped spawn the Proto:87 movement, which is backed by many manufacturers such as Northwest Short Line.

Proto:87 has its own online store that offers various components and kits to help correct these scale inaccuracies, such as kits for assembling accurate, to-scale trackwork and switches, finescale wheels for locomotives and rolling stock, etc.

Similarly, the Proto:48 group is dedicated to finescale modeling in O scale.

See also
 Rail transport modelling scales
 Model railway scales

References

External links
Proto:87 SIG Official website
Club Proto 87 
Proto:87 International Team 
Proto:87 Stores
Fremo:87 (German and English)

Model railroad scales